Bishop England High School is a diocesan Roman Catholic four-year high school in Charleston, South Carolina, United States. It was located on Calhoun Street in downtown Charleston until it moved to a newly constructed 40-acre campus located on Daniel Island in 1998. With an enrollment of 730, Bishop England is the largest private high school in the state of South Carolina. The school was founded in 1915 and was named after John England, the first bishop of the Roman Catholic Diocese of Charleston.

History

On September 22, 1915, Catholic High School opened as a department of the Cathedral School on Queen Street. The Reverend Msgr. Joseph L. O'Brien organized the school with the cooperation of the Reverend James J. May. At that time there were 74 students enrolled in four grade levels: seventh, ninth, tenth, and eleventh. That first faculty consisted of three diocesan priests and three Sisters of Charity of Our Lady of Mercy (O.L.M.).

By the spring of 1916, a growing student enrollment made larger quarters imperative, and the school was moved to a building used by the Cenacle Sisters, an order of nuns, where it remained until 1919. The main building housed the senior high school, and an annex was converted into a biology lab and a seventh grade classroom. The school offered two courses of study: college preparatory and business.

With the Catholic community of Charleston increasing, a drive was initiated to raise $50,000 for a school building to replace the one being used. From 1919 to 1921, the school was housed in its third location at Gregorian Hall on George Street, and its old location was demolished and replaced. The funding drive was a huge success, and ground was broken on July 5, 1921 on the $60,000 building. The school was opened in its fourth building at 203 Calhoun Street on February 18, 1922. By 1940, 25 years after its inception, the school's enrollment had reached 318 students, and the faculty had nearly doubled.

In 1947, the school's first rector, Monsignor O'Brien, retired after having served 32 years, and he was followed by former Bishop England student Rev. Msgr. John L. Manning.

The Catholic community of Charleston sponsored two expansion drives for the high school in the late 1940s; two new buildings were added to the campus. In 1947, the west wing (which housed an auditorium, science laboratory, and offices) was built, and in 1948 the east wing, which was the Father O'Brien gymnasium, was built. Additional land was acquired in 1957, and a two-story annex was constructed, providing eight new classrooms and additional office space.

In June 1959, the Rev. Fr. William J. Croghan, B.E. class of 1940, was appointed as the third rector of Bishop England. By 1960, the faculty had grown to 31 members, and 740 students were enrolled. Additional property was purchased in 1963 and in 1964 on Coming Street, Calhoun Street, and Pitt Street; this property provided classrooms, living quarters for teachers, a maintenance shop, facilities for the school nurse, and a schoolyard. The 1964 school year began with a new rector, the Rev. Robert J. Kelly, and enrollment grew to nearly 800 students. Because of overcrowding between 1966 and 1968, freshman classes were conducted in the old St. Patrick's School on St. Phillip Street.

Bishop England integrated in 1964. In 1968, it merged with Immaculate Conception High School. The student body numbered 850 students with 250 freshmen. The former Immaculate Conception School building on Coming Street became the Bishop England Freshman Building.

Nicholas J. Theos became principal in 1973. He established the BEHS endowment fund in 1985. In 1990, Rev. Msgr. Lawrence B. McInerny became the third B.E. graduate named as rector of the school.

In 1976, a former church building at 172 Calhoun Street was purchased from the College of Charleston. Occupancy took place in 1977 and housed the freshmen.

In 1993, four modular units (eight rooms) were added to accommodate increasing enrollment and temporary additional elementary grades, providing four classrooms, a conference room, and a chapel where mass was celebrated. Enrollment in 1995 was 805, the largest of any private high school in the state. In September 1995, Bishop Thompson officially announced that the school was moving to Daniel Island and its current property would be sold to the College of Charleston. The college's Addlestone Library and Rivers Green replaced the Bishop England campus.

The Daniel Island Development Company, which was partially owned by the Harry Frank Guggenheim Foundation, donated  of land for the school. Construction began in 1996, and Bishop Thompson blessed the ground at the site of the new Bishop England High School in June 1997. In 1998, Theos retired after 25 years of service to Bishop England. David Held, who had been the associate principal since 1997, then became the principal.

With the help of students, alumni, faculty and volunteers, the school was moved to the campus on Daniel Island in summer 1998. In fall 2010, it was announced that Michael C. Bolchoz would assume the position of principal. In 2011, the Bishop England athletic program won its 100th overall state championship, making it the most successful in South Carolina history. In the same year, the school's volleyball team broke the national record for overall state championships, currently with 28, along with the South Carolina record for consecutive state titles, with 18 in a row.

On July 1, 2013, Patrick Finneran assumed the role of principal. The class of 2015 was the school's 100th graduating class.

Sexual abuse scandal
On May 2, 2019, former employee Jeffrey Scofield was arrested for voyeurism charges. It was alleged that Scofield recorded male students changing in their locker room through a window that connected his office to the boys' locker room. Scofield confessed to "liking younger guys" and was fired by the school. Scofield pled guilty to the charges and served 18 months probation. On February 4, 2021, the school and the Roman Catholic Diocese of Charleston were sued for $300 million due to the invasion of privacy and potential sexual exploitation the windows provided. On April 29, 2022, another lawsuit was filed against the school about the windows, claiming that the school was negligent in caring for the students and monitoring the staff's whereabouts and alleging that employees were aware that this was happening.  Four days later, another lawsuit was filed by a female student, claiming that the school was negligent in not protecting her from being filmed and not catching Scofield sooner.

Academics
Bishop England is supported by several K–8 Catholic feeder schools in the Charleston area, including Blessed Sacrament School, Christ Our King, The Nativity School, Divine Redeemer and Charleston Catholic.

Students are required to take four years of theology, mathematics, and English. Catholic mass and various prayer services are compulsory throughout the year, although a significant number of students are not Catholic. Students are required to earn credits in world language, social sciences, fine arts, technology, lab sciences, and physical education. Language instruction is offered in Spanish and French. Bishop England also offers 15 Advanced Placement courses for college credit.

Athletics
In a close of the 2010's special edition, the Bishop England athletic program was named number one in the state of South Carolina, regardless of size, by Sports Illustrated, In 2013, sports publication MaxPreps ranked Bishop England's athletic program 5th in the nation in a combined rankings list of both public and private schools.  That same year, USA Today named Bishop England among the top 10 high school athletic programs in the U.S., writing that "the Bishops carry a tradition of dominance unmatched in the state of South Carolina and much of the Southeast." In a 2020 special report, MaxPreps again named Bishop England the state's most successful high school athletic program. The publication also ranked the school within the top 5 high school programs in the nation, writing that "no other high school athletic program in the American South has been so dominant, in so many sports, for so long." The school has been awarded the SC Athletic Director's Cup for 20 consecutive years, given to the top athletic program in the state.

The volleyball program currently holds the national record for state championships with 28 overall. The team won every state title between 2000 and 2017, and their championship win on November 4, 2017, gave them an 18th consecutive title, also a national record. Bishop England's overall state title count in all sports currently stands at 155, the highest of any South Carolina school.

It is one of three private schools in the state that compete in the SCHSL instead of SCISA, along with Christ Church and St. Joseph's School, both located in Greenville. The Bishops compete in the AAA division. The Be a Bishop Backer Club, dubbed "the Triple B Club", funds a staff of on-campus medical trainers for BE athletes.

Bishop England’s primary rival across all sports is Porter-Gaud School. The rivalry dates back over 100 years and is one of the most prominent in Charleston-area high school sports. In girls’ sports, a heavy rivalry with Ashley Hall also exists.

 Fall sports: volleyball, American football, girls' golf, girls' tennis, swimming, cross country, sailing, cheerleading
 Winter sports: wrestling, basketball, ice hockey
 Spring sports: baseball, softball, soccer, track, boys' tennis, boys' golf, lacrosse, rugby

State championships 
 Baseball: 1997, 1998, 2003, 2005, 2007, 2009, 2011, 2017, 2018, 2019
 Basketball - Boys: 1963
 Basketball - Girls: 2012, 2014, 2015, 2016, 2017, 2019
 Cross Country - Boys: 2009, 2010, 2012, 2019, 2021, 2022
 Cross Country - Girls: 2000, 2006, 2007
 Football: 2011, 2012
 Golf - Boys: 2006, 2008, 2013, 2014, 2015, 2018, 2019
 Golf - Girls: 2015, 2016
 Lacrosse - Boys: 2017, 2021
 Lacrosse - Girls: 2016, 2017, 2018, 2019, 2021, 2022
 Soccer - Boys: 1984, 1992, 1993, 1994, 1995, 1998, 1999, 2000, 2001, 2005, 2006, 2007, 2008, 2009, 2011, 2013, 2016
 Soccer - Girls: 2000, 2002, 2003, 2004, 2005, 2006, 2007, 2008, 2009, 2016, 2018, 2019
 Softball: 2004
 Swimming - Boys: 2016
 Swimming - Girls: 2017, 2022
 Tennis - Boys: 1979, 1986, 1991, 1992, 1993, 1994, 1995, 1998, 2015, 2018, 2019
 Tennis - Girls: 1983, 1988, 1989, 1990, 1991, 1992, 1993, 1997, 1998, 1999, 2000, 2001, 2003, 2007, 2009, 2011, 2012, 2013, 2014, 2015, 2016, 2017, 2018, 2020, 2021
 Track - Boys: 2000, 2008, 2011, 2015
 Track - Girls: 2001, 2002, 2003, 2004, 2005, 2006, 2007, 2008, 2009, 2013, 2014, 2017, 2019
 Volleyball: 1977, 1978, 1981, 1985, 1988, 1989, 1990, 1993, 1994, 1998, 2000, 2001, 2002, 2003, 2004, 2005, 2006, 2007, 2008, 2009, 2010, 2011, 2012, 2013, 2014, 2015, 2016, 2017

Traditions
Bishop England is among the older educational institutions in the city of Charleston and among the oldest private secondary institutions in the state. Generations of Charleston families have attended the school, making it a significant part of the city's history. Several traditions take place throughout the year. These include:
 John England Day – an all-school carnival held every September to celebrate the school's namesake, Bishop John England
 Key Club Food Drive – held each year leading up to Thanksgiving to support local charities and shelters.
 Student vs Faculty Basketball Game
 Academic Awards Night – award ceremony held each spring to honor students for their academic achievement throughout the year
 Ring Mass – blessing of class rings by Bishop Guglielmone, held each spring
 Senior Awards – presentation of scholarships and awards to graduating seniors
 Baccalaureate Mass
 Tie Throwing on the Trees – occurs once a year on the last school day of February
 Harbor Cruise – celebratory cruise in Charleston Harbor for graduating seniors, held each spring in the weeks leading up to Commencement

Facilities
Academic
45 classrooms
4 science labs
Art studio
2 technology labs
The Bishop Thompson Center for the Performing Arts
The Commons
The Monsignor Manning Library

Athletic
Jack Cantey Stadium
Father Kelly Field
Father O'Brien Gymnasium
Michael L. Runey III Tennis Center
Carl Edward Poole Jr. Track and Field Complex
Weight and fitness performance rooms
Golf hosts their home matches at the nearby Daniel Island Club
Ice hockey hosts home games at the Carolina Ice Palace

Spiritual
Our Lady of Mercy Chapel
Campus Ministry Center
Saint Clare of Assisi Roman Catholic Church

Notable alumni
Politics
 Chrissy Adams (class of 1985) — South Carolina solicitor and lawyer
 Thomas F. Hartnett (class of 1960) — U.S. representative from South Carolina, member of South Carolina House of Representatives and South Carolina Senate
 Joseph P. Riley Jr. (class of 1960) — mayor of Charleston, 1975–2016

TV, film, and media
 Dorothea Benton Frank (class of 1969) — author of numerous books set in the South Carolina Lowcountry
 Thomas Gibson (class of 1980) — actor
 T. Christian Miller (class of 1988) — two-time Pulitzer prize winning journalist
 Vanessa Lachey (class of 1999) — Miss Teen USA 1998, television personality, television host, fashion model and actress

Athletics
 Drew Meyer (class of 1999) — Major League Baseball player for the Houston Astros
 Temoc Suarez (class of 1992) — soccer player; spent three seasons in Major League Soccer, two in the National Professional Soccer League and five in the USL First Division
 Dennis Williams (born 1965), basketball player

In popular culture 
Portions of the film Dear John, starring Channing Tatum and Amanda Seyfried and based on the novel by Nicholas Sparks, were filmed on the school's former campus in downtown Charleston.

Portions of the film The Dangerous Lives of Altar Boys, starring Jodie Foster, were filmed inside the buildings from the school's former location on Calhoun Street.

Portions of the film O, starring Mekhi Phifer, Julia Stiles and Josh Hartnett, were filmed in the classrooms and gym at the school's former location on Calhoun Street.

References

Roman Catholic Diocese of Charleston
Educational institutions established in 1915
Catholic secondary schools in South Carolina
Education in Charleston, South Carolina
Schools in Berkeley County, South Carolina
1915 establishments in South Carolina